Naas General Hospital is a general hospital located on the Craddockstown Road at Naas in County Kildare in Ireland. It was founded in 1841 and is managed by Dublin Midlands Hospital Group.

History

The hospital has its origins in the Naas Union Workhouse and Infirmary which was designed by George Wilkinson and opened in 1841. In 1922, shortly after the creation of the Irish Free State, it became Naas County Hospital. During the 1990s, the Department of Health undertook a programme of developing the site as a modern general hospital.

Services
The hospital provides acute services for the population of around 200,000 people in County Kildare and western parts of County Wicklow. The hospital currently has 243 patient beds which include 18 day service beds. The hospital features a 24-hour Emergency Department.

References

External links
 Official site

1841 establishments in Ireland
Hospitals established in 1841
Hospitals in County Kildare
Naas
Teaching hospitals of the University of Dublin, Trinity College
Health Service Executive hospitals
Hospital buildings completed in 1841